Acartauchenius planiceps is a species of sheet weaver found in Algeria. It was described by Bosmans in 2002.

References

Linyphiidae
Spiders described in 2002
Spiders of North Africa
Endemic fauna of Algeria